Marcus Freeman (born January 10, 1986) is an American football coach and former linebacker who is currently the head coach at the University of Notre Dame. He previously served as the defensive coordinator and linebackers coach at Notre Dame in 2021. Freeman has also previously served as an assistant coach at the University of Cincinnati, Purdue University, Kent State University, and Ohio State University.

Freeman played college football at Ohio State and was drafted by the Chicago Bears in the fifth round of the 2009 NFL Draft. He has also been a member of the Buffalo Bills and Houston Texans.

Early years
His father Michael Freeman met his mother Chong while he was serving in the Air Force in South Korea. Marcus was born at the Wright-Patterson Air Force Base Medical Center in Fairborn, Ohio. He has an older brother, Michael Jr. The family lived in Huber Heights and Marcus attended Wayne High School.

Freeman was rated as one of the top three overall prospects in Ohio as a senior and named to the Parade All-America team coming out of Wayne High School in Huber Heights, Ohio. He was credited with 127 tackles, four sacks, three forced fumbles and three fumble recoveries as a senior. He totaled 152 tackles, including 29 behind the line of scrimmage, and eight sacks as a junior. Freeman was a four-year starter and a two-time first-team All-Ohio selection. He also ran track, competing in the 4×100-meter relay and throwing the shot and discus.

Playing career

College
Marcus Freeman attended Ohio State University (2004–08), appearing in 51 games (37 starts) over the course of his career. He started 26 games at weak-side linebacker and 11 games at strong-side linebacker and was a two-time Second-team All-Big Ten selection. He finished his career 19th on the school's all-time tackle list with 268 stops (140 solo) and was credited with 21.5 TFLs, 6.0 sacks, 15 PBUs, 2 forced fumbles and 1 fumble recovery.

In 2008, he started all 13 games at linebacker.  He was a Second-team All-Big Ten selection, finishing with 84 tackles (39 solo) and added 9.5 TFLs, 4 PBUs, 1 fumble recovery and 3.5 sacks. Also named Academic All-Big Ten. In 2007, he was a second-year starting linebacker and a part of three special units and was Second-team All-Big Ten after he totaled 109 tackles 9.5 TFL, 5 PBU. In 2006, he made 71 stops, played 13 games and started 11 at linebacker and was second on the team with six pass break-ups  and two interceptions. In 2005, he redshirted. In 2004, he finished his rookie season with four tackles, recording one solo stop and three assists, in 13 games.

National Football League

Pre-draft

Chicago Bears
Freeman was drafted in the fifth round of the 2009 NFL Draft by the Chicago Bears. He was waived on September 4, 2009.

Buffalo Bills
Freeman was signed to the Buffalo Bills practice squad on September 22. He later was released in early October.

Houston Texans
Freeman signed with the Houston Texans on November 4.

Retirement
On May 1, 2010, Freeman retired due to an enlarged heart condition.

Coaching career

Early career
After serving as a Graduate Assistant at his alma mater in 2010, he was the linebackers and assistant coach for Kent State in 2011–12.

He was hired as the Purdue linebackers coach in January 2013. For the 2016 season, Freeman was promoted to co-defensive coordinator. Freeman helped transform the linebackers group into a strength for the Boilermakers, coaching future NFL players Danny Ezechukwu and Ja'Whaun Bentley.

Cincinnati (Assistant)
On December 13, 2016, Freeman joined the Cincinnati Bearcats football staff. After being one of the first hires by Luke Fickell, Freeman transformed the Bearcats into one of the best defenses of the American Athletic Conference (AAC). In 2018, Freeman's defense led the AAC in rushing defense, scoring defense and total defense and ranked among the Top-15 in the NCAA FBS in all three categories. The next season, the Bearcats finished atop the 2019 AAC ranks in scoring defense for the second-straight season and ranked among the league's top three in rushing and total defense.

Prior to the end of the 2020 season, Freeman had declined a handful of positions to remain at Cincinnati including offers of returning to Ohio State as linebackers coach, linebackers coach for the Tennessee Titans, and defensive coordinator at Michigan State, among other offers. Freeman had been considered by a number of national outlets as one of the rising stars of the college coaching ranks.

Freeman was a finalist for the Broyles Award and named the 247Sports Defensive Coordinator of the Year, during the 2020 season.

Notre Dame
On January 8, 2021, Freeman was hired as defensive coordinator and linebackers coach for Notre Dame. Freeman was head coach Brian Kelly's top choice for the position. Prior to this hiring, it was rumored that Freeman would join LSU in the same role.

Following the 2021 regular season, Brian Kelly left Notre Dame to become the head coach at Louisiana State University.
On December 3, 2021, Freeman was selected to replace him, becoming the 30th head coach in program history. 
Freeman took control immediately, coaching the Irish in their Fiesta Bowl loss to Oklahoma State. 

Freeman opened the 2022 season with losses to Ohio State and Marshall, thus becoming first head coach in Notre Dame history to start his career with three losses.  
He gained his first win the following week against the Golden Bears. Freeman's Irish would go on to finish the regular season ranked 19th with a record of 8-4, including a win over No. 5 Clemson. They were awarded a berth in the Gator Bowl where they defeated South Carolina 45–38.

Personal life
In 2010, Freeman married Joanna (née Herncane),  who he had dated since college. Marcus had child Bria in 2010. The couple has six children: Vinny, Siena, Gino, Nico, Capri and Rocco. In 2022, Freeman became a Catholic.

Head coaching record

References

External links
 Notre Dame profile
 Chicago Bears profile

1986 births
Living people
20th-century African-American people
21st-century African-American sportspeople
African-American coaches of American football
African-American players of American football
American football linebackers
American sportspeople of Korean descent
Buffalo Bills players
Chicago Bears players
Cincinnati Bearcats football coaches
Coaches of American football from Ohio
Houston Texans players
Kent State Golden Flashes football coaches
Notre Dame Fighting Irish football coaches
Ohio State Buckeyes football coaches
Ohio State Buckeyes football players
People from Huber Heights, Ohio
Players of American football from Ohio
Purdue Boilermakers football coaches
African-American Catholics